Manik Sarkar was sworn in as Chief Minister of Tripura on 6 March 2013. 
Here is the list of ministers:

Cabinet ministers
Ministers sworn on 6 March 2013:

References

2013 in Indian politics
Communist Party of India (Marxist) state ministries
Tripura ministries
2013 establishments in Tripura
2018 disestablishments in India
Cabinets established in 2013
Cabinets disestablished in 2018